Sohail Ahmed, (born 1 May 1963), also known as Azizi, is a Pakistani comedian, stage and TV actor. 

He appears in comedy stage and TV dramas based in Lahore. He also appears in a popular Dunya TV show Hasb-e-Haal. His character Azizi was developed by Aftab Iqbal when he started Hasb e Haal on Dunya News.

Family
His grandfather Dr. Faqir Muhammad Faqir (1900-1974) was a philanthropist as well a writer called Baba-e-Punjabi ("father of Punjabi") because he authored more than 40 books in Punjabi, while his father Mian Muhammad Akram was DSP Gujranwala. 

His son Hamza Sohail, an MBA from London, is also an actor, debuting in 2021 with Hum TV’s Raqeeb Se.

Career 
In January  2009, Sohail started playing the character Azizi in the show Hasb-e-Haal on Dunya News, where he does humorous commentary on current affairs and other topics. Most of the TV shows that he has acted in have been on Pakistan Television Corporation. Sohail Ahmed prefers to use unplanned dialogue during comedy shows.

Stage dramas 
 Shartiya Mithay
 Kaali Chaadar
 Feeqa In America
 Kotha
 Ek Tera Sanam Khana
 Roti Khol Deo
 Bara maza aye ga
 Double Sawari
 Topi Drama
 Ashiqo Gham Na Karo
 Luddi Hai Jamalou
 Kuch Na Kaho
 Suway Lal
 Deewanay Mastanay
 Sawa Sair
 Saheli Mere Shohar Ki
 Le Ja Sakhiya
 Shabash Begum
 Khirki Ke Peechay
 Soney Ki Chirya
 Haye Oye
 Kangley Parauhne
 Raja Ab To Aaja
 Haasay Wandi De
 Aik Jhoot aur Sahi
 Wonderful
 Sohni Lagdi
 Ketchup
 Rawangi Baraat
 Dum Dama Dum
 Love Spot
 Baba Cable
 Hazar Janaab
 Mouqa Milay kadi kadi
 Taj Mahal
 High Speed
 No Tension
 Begum Mujhe Eidi Do
 Paon Ka Zewar
 Wailay Masroof
 Kaun Jeeta Kaun Haara
 Pholay Badshah
 Baba Bori
 Munday Nu Samjhao
 Anokhi Dulhan
 Garam Garam
 Nokar Sahib
 Reshman Jawan Ho Gayi
 Dil Da Boowa
 Check Post
 Hot Pot
 Chabian
 Yeh Baat Aur Hai
 Miss Peeno
 Anjanay Log
 De Ja Sakhya
 Khandan de Khadonay

List of television dramas 
 Fishar (PTV) 1990 as Student leader
 Home Sweet Home (PTV) 1998
 Havaili (PTV) 1992
 Shab Daig (PTV) 1993 As Mister shah
 Din (PTV) 1992
 Lawrence of Thalebia (PTV) 1994
 Eindhan (PTV) 1995
 Reza Reza (PTV) 1995
 Ghareeb e Shehr (PTV) 1999
 Mashwara Muft Hai (PTV) 2000
 Kajal Ghar (PTV) 2001 as Chaudhry Riasat Ali
 Shanakhat (PTV) 2003
 Sussar In Law (PTV) 2005
 Malangi (PTV) 2006
 Kharidar (ATV) 2006
 Choki number 420 (AAJ TV) 2008
 Juda (ATV) 2008
 Shaam (ATV)  2010
 Ullu Baraye Farokht Nahi (HUM TV) 2013
 Andleeb (PTV)
 Chaudhry and Sons (Geo Entertainment) 2022

List of television shows 
 Parody punch show lasted for just 4 episodes on ARY Digital.
 Hasb-e-Haal comedy show on Dunya News since 2009

Films

Awards and honors
 Pride of Performance Award by the President of Pakistan in 2011
 Sitara-i-Imtiaz (Star of Excellence) Award by the President of Pakistan in 2013

See also 
 List of Lollywood actors

References 

1963 births
Living people
Male actors from Lahore
Pakistani male television actors
Pakistani male stage actors
Pakistani stand-up comedians
Pakistani Sunni Muslims
Pakistani people of Kashmiri descent
People from Gujranwala
People from Gujranwala District
Punjabi people
Recipients of the Pride of Performance
Recipients of Sitara-i-Imtiaz
20th-century Pakistani male actors
21st-century Pakistani male actors